The 2020 London Spitfire season was the third season of the London Spitfire's existence in the Overwatch League. The Spitfire planned to host two homestand events in the 2020 season; the first was to be held at The SSE Arena Wembley, while the second was to be at the National Exhibition Centre in Birmingham. However, all homestand events were canceled due to the COVID-19 pandemic.

Preceding offseason

Organizational changes 
In early October 2019, the Spitfire parted ways with coach Kim "Jfeel" Jeong-min, who had been with the team since London's inception.

London found their new head coach within the organization, promoting assistant coach Hong "Agape" Cheol-yong to the position. Additionally, the team signed former New York Excelsior head coach Ty "Pavane" Hyun-sang, former Florida Mayhem assistant coach Kim "SNT" Sung-hoon, and former O2 Blast assistant coach Lim "Twinkl" Young-bin all as assistant coaches. The changes reunited Agape, Pavane, and SNT, as Apage and Pavane previously coached LuxuryWatch Blue and LuxuryWatch Red together, while SNT played with LuxuryWatch Red at the same time.

Roster changes 

The Spitfire enter the new season with three free agents, one players which they have the option to retain for another year, and five players under contract. The OWL's deadline to exercise a team option is 11 November, after which any players not retained will become a free agent. Free agency officially began on 7 October.

Acquisitions 
The Spitfire's first acquisitions of the offseason were announced on 30 October, when the team traded tank Kim "Fury" Jun-ho to the Philadelphia Fusion in exchange for Fusion University players tank Shin "BERNAR" Se-won and support Kim "Fuze" Tae-hoon.

London announced eight players on their roster on 23 November. The five new players announced were support players Lee "Highly" Sung-hyeok and Lim "SanGuiNar" Kyu-min, DPS players Lee "Schwi" Dong-Jae and Lim "Glister" Gil-seong, as well as tank player Choi "JMAC" Dae Han. Of the players, only Highly has ever previously played for an OWL team, while the remaining had only experience in Overwatch Contenders. The following month, on 27 December, London announced four more players to round out their 12-man roster in damage players Jung "Although" Hyun-wook and Park "Babel" Sang-jun and support players Kim "Jihun" Ji-hun and Cho "Clestyn" Gun-hee.

Departures 
The Spitfire elected not to re-sign all three of their free agents, DPS Kim "Birdring" Ji-hyeok, support Kim "NUS" Jong-seok, and alternate DPS Lee "Guard" Hee-dong, heading into the 2020 season.

On 22 October, the Spitfire agreed to transfer tank Hong "Gesture" Jae-hee and DPS Park "Profit" Joon-yeong to the Seoul Dynasty. The team released Choi "Bdosin" Seung-tae and Song "Quatermain" Ji-hoon in mid-November. With the release of Bdosin, no players from the Spitfire's 2018 Grand Finals roster remained with the team.

Roster

Standings

Game log

Regular season

Midseason tournaments 

| style="text-align:center;" | Bonus wins awarded: 0

Postseason

References 

London Spitfire
London Spitfire
London Spitfire seasons